Paramount High School is a comprehensive public high school in Paramount, California, USA. It is part of the Paramount Unified School District. The school serves students in grades 9–12 on two campuses, West Campus for 9th grade students and Senior Campus for grades 10–12. Being the largest school in the area with one of the highest populations in California, most students enrolled come from the cities of Paramount, Lakewood, Bellflower, Long Beach, Rancho Dominguez and South Gate.

Campuses
West Campus, which serves ninth grade students, located at 14708 Paramount Blvd.
Senior Campus, which serves grades 10–12, located at 14429 Downey Ave.

Curriculum
Paramount High School offers a comprehensive curriculum. A number of Advanced Placement classes are available for interested students.

Reconstruction
On 2008, Paramount High School has Renovations, Modernizations, and New Constructions. The $72 Million high school program includes a new athletic stadium, field house, mini gym, academic/science classroom building, and library/media center. The first phrase of program scheduled for construction is the athletic stadium and field house. The project incorporates solar power into all new buildings.

The site was completed in 2010.

Athletics

The Paramount Pirates play in the San Gabriel Valley League against Lynwood, Downey, Warren, Dominguez and Gahr. The Paramount boys' soccer team was 2010 Division III and State Regional Division I CIF champions. The Paramount boys' soccer team won CIF for 3 consecutive years (2010, 2011, 2012) thus given the nickname, the 3-peat champs. In 2012, they also won State Regional Champions. The Paramount wrestling team was 2011 Division VI CIF runner-up. In 2012, the Paramount boys varsity tennis won the first ever 4-peat in tennis. The recent years that tennis has won league, was in 2009, 2010, 2011, and 2012. The Pirates have also won CIF state for boys soccer in 2017.

Notable alumni

 Dante Basco – actor, singer
 Traphik (TimothyDeLaGhetto) – actor, comedian, rapper, YouTube personality
 Charles Huerta – Professional boxer
 Brian Hunter – MLB player
 Cassh Maluia, NFL player
 Leon Neal – NFL player, running back
 Antonio Pierce – NFL player, linebacker
 Rico Smith Jr. - NFL player, wide receiver
 Adán Chalino Sánchez – singer
 Jeff Sellers – MLB player
 YG – rapper
 Gil Velazquez – professional baseball player

References

External links
Paramount High School West Campus
Paramount High School Senior Campus

High schools in Los Angeles County, California
Public high schools in California
Paramount, California
1953 establishments in California
Educational institutions established in 1953